Sophie Amiach (born 10 November 1963 in Paris) is a former professional tennis player from France who played on the WTA tour from 1980 to 1995. 

Currently, she provides commentary on professional tennis in both English and French for different networks throughout the world. Perform/WTA that is the Women’s Tennis Association world feed, www.wtatv.com including the 2018 WTA Finals and Elite Trophy, ESPN (during the US Open), Input Media at Roland Garros (French Open), RMC a French Network. Sophie also covered the 2016 Wimbledon final between Serena Williams and Angelique Kerber for BBC Radio.

Career 
Born in Paris, Sophie Amiach grew up in the south of France. Having started playing tennis at 4 years old, she became one of the best French juniors. She won the first junior girls doubles at French Open in 1981. Amiach was selected in the 1981 French team of the then-Federation Cup. She reached the quarterfinals of the Australian Open in 1984 and played in 10 French Opens. In 1987, Amiach was coached by Billie Jean King.

WTA Finals

Doubles(0–1)

ITF Finals

Singles (0-4)

Doubles (6–5)

Grand Slam singles performance timeline

References

External links
 
 
 

1963 births
Living people
French female tennis players
Grand Slam (tennis) champions in girls' doubles
French Open junior champions